The Esk River of Hawke's Bay, in the eastern North Island of New Zealand, one of two rivers of that name in the country, is one of Hawke's Bay's major rivers. State Highway 5 follows the lower course of the river for several kilometres close to the settlement of Eskdale. The river is probably named after the Esk River in southern Scotland and north-west England.

Where the river reaches the sea, it ponds behind a shingle bank. At times the sea drives up shingle that blocks the outlet until the ponding water breaks through. The outlet occasionally needs to be opened artificially to prevent flooding. Prior to the 1931 Hawke's Bay earthquake, the pond also flowed into the Petane Stream and south through Bay View into the northern end of Ahuriri Lagoon when the beach outlet was blocked. The earthquake raised the area, preventing the ponded water from flowing through Bay View any longer.

The southern stretch of the river forms the northern boundary for urban development in Napier. Hukarere Girls' College is near the river, as well as the Pan Pac Forest Products mill. A 4 MW hydroelectric power scheme is situated in the higher reaches of the river. Chardonnay and red wine grapes are grown in the Esk River valley.

The lower  of the Esk can be suitable for whitewater canoeing when the flow is above normal. There are brown and rainbow trout in the river, but fishing is restricted.

Flooding

The river has a history of flooding. Flash flooding inundated the settlement in March 2018, leaving most of the local holiday park underwater. Large parts of the valley were inudated during Cyclone Gabrielle in February 2023. The floods caused significant damage in the settlement, destoying houses and sections of State Highway 5 and the Palmerston North–Gisborne Railway Line.

See also
Esk River (Canterbury)
List of rivers of New Zealand

References

Rivers of the Hawke's Bay Region
Rivers of New Zealand